Dean George Cain ( Tanaka; born July 31, 1966) is an American actor. From 1993 to 1997, he played Clark Kent / Superman in the TV series Lois & Clark: The New Adventures of Superman. Cain was the host of Ripley's Believe It or Not! and appeared in the sports drama series Hit the Floor.

Early life
Dean George Tanaka was born on July 31, 1966, in Mount Clemens, Michigan, to Roger Tanaka, a U.S. serviceman, and actress Sharon Thomas. Through his biological father, Cain is of partly Japanese descent, with the rest of his ancestry being Welsh, Irish and French Canadian. Cain has said of his biological father, whom he never met: "He's not the kind of man I want to be. He was an unfaithful husband and not much of a father." Soon after Dean's birth, his mother, pursuing an acting career, moved him and his older brother Roger to Los Angeles. In 1969, Sharon later married film director Christopher Cain, who adopted Dean and Roger. The couple moved to Malibu, California, and later had a daughter, Krisinda.

Cain attended Santa Monica High School, where he excelled in sports. Among his schoolmates were Charlie Sheen, who played on the same baseball team as Cain when they were children, as well as Rob Lowe and his brother, Chad. Cain graduated from high school in 1984 and attended Princeton University, where he starred as a free safety on the football team. set a Princeton season record with 12 interceptions (in just ten games) during the 1987 season, and finished his collegiate career with 22 interceptions in 30 games. During his senior year, Cain was awarded the John P. Poe–Richard W. Kazmaier, Jr. Football Trophy.  He dated actress Brooke Shields while at the university. Cain graduated in 1988 with a Bachelor of Arts in history. His senior thesis was titled "The History and Development of the Functions of the Academy of Motion Picture Arts and Sciences".

Career

NFL
After graduating, Cain signed on as a free agent with the NFL's Buffalo Bills, but a knee injury during training camp ended his football career prematurely.

Acting 

With little hope of returning to sports, Cain turned to screenwriting and then acting, shooting dozens of commercials including a volleyball-themed spot for Kellogg's Frosted Flakes and appearing on popular television shows like Grapevine, A Different World and Beverly Hills, 90210.

In 1993, Cain took on his biggest role to date as Superman in the television series Lois & Clark: The New Adventures of Superman. At the height of its popularity the program would bring in an average of at least 15 million viewers per episode. The series ran for four seasons, ending in 1997.

In 1998, Cain started the Angry Dragon Entertainment production company, which produced the TBS Superstation television series Ripley's Believe It or Not! He has also starred in several films, including The Broken Hearts Club (2000), Rat Race (2001), Out of Time (2003) and Bailey's Billion$ (2004). In 2004, he portrayed Scott Peterson in the made-for-television movie The Perfect Husband: The Laci Peterson Story. He appeared in a recurring role as Casey Manning in the television series Las Vegas. Cain made a return to the Superman franchise, with a special guest role in a season seven episode of Smallville as the immortal Dr. Curtis Knox, a character based upon the DC Comics villain Vandal Savage; and again in a recurring role on Supergirl, as the title character's foster father, Jeremiah Danvers. He is also the star of the VH1 hit series Hit the Floor as Pete Davenport, who is the new head coach of a fictional NBA team and has an illegitimate daughter who is a cheerleader for his NBA team. He was ranked No. 33 on VH1's 40 Hottest Hotties of the '90s.

Cain was a contestant in an NBC celebrity reality competition series called Stars Earn Stripes. He won four out of six missions on the show, though he came in third in the finals. In 2012, he participated in Fox's dating game show The Choice.

In 2013, Cain hosted a reality show about Bigfoot titled 10 Million Dollar Bigfoot Bounty, where he offered contestants $10 million to prove the existence of Bigfoot. Cain appeared in the mid-season premiere of Comic Book Men, appearing at Kevin Smith's Secret Stash where the crew was celebrating 75 years of Superman, citing that Dean Cain helped people care about Superman again.  Cain appeared in the film God's Not Dead, in which he plays an arrogant businessman.  In 2016, Cain played a guest role on the Netflix original series Lady Dynamite as Graham the ex-fiancé of Maria Bamford.

Between 2015 and 2017, he portrayed Jeremiah Danvers in Supergirl.

Cain is known for appearing in 16 Christmas films and several faith-based films.

As of 2018, Cain is hosting a television infomercial for The National Real Estate Network, an entity which seeks to persuade individuals to attend meetings where they can learn about flipping real estate. In October 2018, it was learned that Ronnie Mund (Ronnie the Limo Driver), the personal driver and bodyguard of radio DJ Howard Stern, had been using a photoshopped picture of Cain as a publicity photo. Specifically, Mund's head had been transposed onto the body of Cain. Mund initially denied the photo was altered but eventually acknowledged he had been using the fraudulent photo for over five years. Mund claimed he was unaware the photo was not genuine. Cain co-starred in the 2018 film Gosnell: The Trial of America's Biggest Serial Killer about the investigation and trial of  Kermit Gosnell. He  starred in the film Andy the Talking Hedgehog.

In 2019, Cain starred in the play FBI Lovebirds alongside Kristy Swanson, a play that mocked Peter Strzok and Lisa Page, the two FBI operatives at the center of the investigation into Russian interference in the 2016 United States elections.

In June 2021, it was announced that he would have his directorial debut with Little Angels and star in it.

Cain is the Actor in Residence at High Point University.

Personal life
During the 1980s, Cain dated actress Brooke Shields for two years while they were both attending Princeton University. In 1992, he dated professional beach volleyball player and model Gabrielle Reece. In 1997, Cain became engaged to singer Mindy McCready; The couple split the following year.

He has a son named Christopher Dean Cain (born June 11, 2000) with ex-girlfriend and Playboy Playmate and Spanish model Samantha Torres. Cain named his son after his adoptive father, film director Christopher Cain.

On June 19, 2018, Cain was sworn in as a reserve police officer for the St. Anthony Police Department in St. Anthony, Idaho.

Political views
Cain said in 2018 that he was once a registered Republican, but later became a registered Independent, as he felt that the Republican Party did not fully represent his views.

He voted for Bill Clinton twice, and voted for Democrat Al Gore in the 2000 election, the latter of which he later said he regretted.

He supported Republican candidate John McCain for president in the 2008 election; supported Rick Perry for president in the 2012 election. In 2016 and 2020, he endorsed Donald Trump.

Cain has stated he is "very leftist" on social issues, citing his support of marijuana legalization, and conservative on economic and foreign policy issues.

In 2018, Cain was elected to the board of directors of the National Rifle Association.

Filmography

Film

Television

Video games

References

External links

 
 
 Dean Cain on Yahoo movies

20th-century American male actors
21st-century American male actors
1966 births
American adoptees
American football safeties
American male actors of Japanese descent
American male child actors
American male film actors
American male television actors
American film actors of Asian descent
American people of English descent
American people of French-Canadian descent
American people of Irish descent
American people of Welsh descent
California Independents
Living people
Male actors from California
Male actors from Michigan
Participants in American reality television series
People from Mount Clemens, Michigan
Princeton Tigers football players
Princeton University alumni
California Republicans